This is a comprehensive timeline and listing of past and present members of Fishbone, a U.S. alternative rock band formed in 1979 in Los Angeles, California, which plays a fusion of ska, punk rock, funk, hard rock, and soul.

This list only includes official members of the band, not various session or onstage musicians who have filled in for departed or absent members.

Fishbone first assembled in 1979 with John Norwood Fisher (bass), his brother Philip "Fish" Fisher (drums), Angelo Moore (vocals, saxophones and theremin), Kendall Jones (guitar), "Dirty" Walter A. Kibby II (vocals, trumpet), and Christopher Dowd (keyboards, trombone, vocals). The first founding member to depart was Kendall Jones in 1993, followed by Christopher Dowd in 1994, Philip Fisher in 1998, and Walter Kibby in 2003. John Norwood Fisher and Angelo Moore are the only members to remain with the band throughout its history. In the 2010s, all the other original members except Kendall Jones rejoined the band for various reunions and anniversary activities. In November 2020, Kendall Jones joined the band on stage for the first time since 1993 for a performance of "Them Bones" by Alice In Chains for a tribute to the band arranged by the Museum of Pop Culture.

Members

Timeline of official members

List of Fishbone line-ups

External links 

Fishbone.net – Official band website
FishboneLive.org – Collaborative Fishbone encyclopedia (semi-official)
Fishbone at Legacy Recordings
Fishbone on the Live Music Archive – Fishbone's section of archive.org's free live concert recordings.

Fishbone
Articles which contain graphical timelines